is a private women's junior college in Settsu, Osaka, Japan, established in 1966.

External links
 Official website

Educational institutions established in 1966
Educational institutions disestablished in 2013
Defunct private universities and colleges in Japan
Settsu, Osaka
Universities and colleges in Osaka Prefecture
Women's universities and colleges in Japan
1966 establishments in Japan
2013 disestablishments in Japan
Japanese junior colleges